Lubābah bint Jaʿfar was an Abbasid princess, granddaughter of second Abbasid caliph al-Mansur, niece of third Abbasid caliph al-Mahdi and the principal wife of fourth Abbasid caliph al-Hadi.

Her full name was Lubabah bint Ja'far ibn Abd Allah al-Mansur. She was the daughter of prince Ja'far ibn Abd Allah also known as Jafar ibn al-Mansur. She was named Lubabah by her father and grandfather, the meaning of her name was innermost essence. She married al-Hadi, son of her uncle caliph al-Mahdi. 

Al-Hadi had two wives. One was Lubabah bint Ja'far ibn al-Mansur. The second was Ubaydah, daughter of Ghitrif and, niece of al-Khayzuran. Her husband married her around 783 or 785. She was almost of same age as her husband. She became the influential wife of al-Hadi however, al-Hadi died after a short reign of fourteen months.

Lubabah had no children from her marriage. The children of her husband were Ja'far, Al-Abbas, Abd Allah, Ishaq, Isma'il, Sulayman and Musa. Of the two daughters, one was Umm Isa, who married al-Ma'mun, and the other was Umm al-Abbas, who was nicknamed Nunah. All of them were born of concubines. Lubabah didn't have her own children possibly due to her husband's early death in 786 at the age of 22. Very little is known about her after she became a widow. It is not known whether she remarried or not after him.

Family
Lubabah was related to the Abbasid ruling House both paternally and at one point through marriage. She was contemporary to several Abbasid caliphs, Abbasid prince and Princesses. Lubabah had no children from her husband al-Hadi however, she had several step children.

References

Sources

Al-Suyuti: History of the Caliphs

8th-century births
9th-century deaths
8th-century women from the Abbasid Caliphate
Wives of Abbasid caliphs
8th-century people from the Abbasid Caliphate
Arab princesses
8th-century Arabs